Shelter Me may refer to
 "Shelter Me", a 1998 song by the Waifs
 "Shelter Me" (Cinderella song), 1990
 Shelter Me (2007 film), Riparo – Anis tra di noi, a 2007 Italian-French film directed by Marco Simon Puccioni
 "Shelter Me", a song by Buddy Miller from Universal United House of Prayer, covered by Tab Benoit
 "Shelter Me", a song by Lee Dagger featuring Inaya Day
 "Shelter Me", a song by Joe Cocker from his album Cocker
 "Shelter Me", a song by Train from their album For Me, It's You

See also
 Gimme Shelter (disambiguation)
 Protect Me (disambiguation)
 Cover Me (disambiguation)